Bangabandhu Memorial Trust is a trust in Bangladesh that was created to remember Sheikh Mujibur Rahman, the founding father of Bangladesh. Prime Minister Sheikh Hasina is the chair of the trust.

History
On 11 April 1994, Sheikh Hasina, daughter of Sheikh Mujibur Rahman, established the Bangabandhu Memorial Trust. On 6 September 1994, Sheikh Hasina handed over the deed of Bangabandhu Bhaban, the personal residence to Bangabandhu Memorial Trust. The trust turned Bangabandhu Bhaban in to a museum, Bangabandhu Memorial Museum. The first head of the museum was A. F. Salahuddin Ahmed. After A. F. Salahuddin Ahmed died, Hashem Khan took over as the head of the museum. The trust established the Sheikh Fazilatunnessa Mujib Memorial KPJ Specialized Hospital, named after Sheikh Fazilatunnesa Mujib, wife of Sheikh Mujibur Rahman.

On 17 May 2017, a consortium of banks donated 1360 million Bangladeshi taka ($16.7M as of 2017) to the trust along with Prime Minister’s Education Assistance Trust and Shuchona Foundation. On 6 January 2020, Standard Bank donated 100 million taka to the trust on the occasion of Mujib Year. Five other banks also donated large amounts to the trust on occasion of Mujib Year. The Ministry of Education ordered the nationalization of 15 colleges named after Sheikh Mujibur Rahman and his family members after the trust and trust chairperson, Prime Minister Sheikh Hasina approved the nationalization.

References

Sheikh Mujibur Rahman
1994 establishments in Bangladesh
Organisations based in Dhaka
Foundations based in Bangladesh